Nils Larsen Glacier is a glacier descending to the west coast of Peter I Island close northward of Norvegia Bay. In February 1929 the crew of the Norvegia carried out a series of investigations of this island, landing on February 2. Named for Nils Larsen, captain of the Norvegia.

Glaciers of Antarctica
Peter I Island